Diellza Musa (born 29 November 1997) is a Kosovo Albanian professional footballer who plays as a goalkeeper for Kosovan club Mitrovica and the Kosovo national team.

International career

Albania

Under-19
On 15 September 2015, Musa made her debut with Albania U19 in a 2016 UEFA Women's Under-19 Championship qualification match against Austria U19 after being named in the starting line-up.

Kosovo
On 27 February 2017, Musa was named as part of the Kosovo squad for 2017 Alanya Goldcity
Women's Cup. On 3 March 2017, she made his debut with Kosovo in a match against Romania after being named in the starting line-up.

See also
List of Kosovo women's international footballers

References

External links

Diellza Musa at the Albanian Football Association

1997 births
Living people
Sportspeople from Mitrovica, Kosovo
Women's association football goalkeepers
Kosovan women's footballers
Kosovo women's international footballers
Albanian women's footballers
KFF Vllaznia Shkodër players
KFF Mitrovica players
KFF Hajvalia players